The Arch of Dolabella and Silanus (Latin, Arcus Dolabellae et Silani) or Arch of Dolabella is an ancient Roman arch. It was built by senatorial decree in 10 AD by the consuls P. Cornelius Dolabella and C. Junius Silanus.

Arch
The arch is located on the Caelian Hill, at the north corner of the site of the Castra Peregrina. It spans the modern Via di S. Paolo della Croce, along the line of the ancient Clivus Scauri. Its location indicates that it was a rebuilding of one of the gates of the Servian Walls, though which one is unclear: possibly the Porta Querquetulana (or Querquetularia) or the Porta Caelimontana. Although the latter is considered the more likely original, there is no indication that any important road went out of the city through the Caelimontana.

History
The extension of the Aqua Claudia undertaken during the reign of Nero made use of the Arch of Dolabella for the last section. Its original purpose was probably to support a branch of the Aqua Marcia.

The travertine arch was not decorated with sculptural relief.

See also

List of ancient monuments in Rome

References

External links
 Bill Thayer's photo at LacusCurtius
 

AD 10
0s in the Roman Empire
Buildings and structures completed in the 1st century
Ancient Roman buildings and structures in Rome
Gates in the Servian Wall
10s establishments in the Roman Empire
10s establishments
Rome R. XIX Celio